Wang Xiaoya (born 22 January 1968) is a Chinese television host and media personality.

She won the Golden Mike Award in 2003.

Biography
Wang was born in Zhaojue County, Sichuan in January 1968, her father was an editor in Liangshan Daily.

She entered Sichuan University in 1986, majoring in economic, where she graduated in 1990.

After graduation, she worked as a journalist in Sichuan Gaige Newspaper Office for six years. She resigned and studied at Communication University of China in 1996.

Wang joined the China Central Television in 1997, she hosted Golden Land and Quiz Show.

Awards
 2003 Golden Mike Award

Personal life
Wang was married to Chinese businessman Lu Chenggong in 1996, the couple divorced in 2001.

Wang remarried in July 2009 to Cao Jianming, a Chinese politician who is the former Procurator-General of the Supreme People's Procuratorate and the current Vice Chairperson of the National People's Congress.

References

1968 births
People from Liangshan
Sichuan University alumni
Communication University of China alumni
Living people
CCTV television presenters